GMX Mail is a free advertising-supported email service provided by GMX (Global Mail eXchange, in Germany: Global Message eXchange). Users may access received GMX Mail via webmail, or using POP3 or IMAP4 protocols. Mail is sent using SMTP. Founded in 1997, GMX is a subsidiary of United Internet AG, a stock-listed company in Germany, and a sister company to 1&1 Internet and Fasthosts Internet. In addition to an email address, each GMX account includes a Mail Collector, Address Book, Organizer, and File Storage. Every user can register up to 10 individual GMX email addresses. Popup ads are displayed to all users, including premium, at login;  GMX was the only large email provider using popup ads.

Security

GMX Mail provides GMX.net and GMX.com users two-factor authentication (2FA) as a security measure.

Features 
Features included in the free versions of the GMX Mail account differ between GMX.net and GMX.com:

GMX.com 

Additional functionalities:
 File sharing capabilities
 Virus and spam protection
 Drag and Drop capability for files and emails
 Fetching external POP3 accounts

Email accounts can be registered with a choice of .com, .co.uk and .us, amongst many others. It allows the addition of up to 10 add-on addresses at different GMX domains. Its "mail collector" allows for the collection of email from most free email providers including Yahoo, Live, Hotmail and GMail as well as send mail from these addresses, allowing the management of multiple accounts from one single location. There is an active community, where users can suggest features.

GMX developed slightly different clients for users in German-speaking countries and elsewhere. Both are free for email service, and direct users to the appropriate gmx.net or gmx.com through geolocation technology. The GMX Mail service is based on Qooxdoo, an open source ajax web application framework.

Growth
Following the closure of Lycos Europe and its decision to close Caramail, a popular French webmail service, in February 2009 GMX bought the Caramail domain name and transferred older Caramail users to its new service. In 2010, GMX acquired American internet domain Mail.com and its email customers.

References

External links 
 GMX.net Mail
 GMX.com Mail

Webmail